T. P. Muthulakshmi (Native name: தமிழ்: டி. பி. முத்துலட்சுமி) was an Indian actress who was active from the 1950 to 1969. She was a prominent lead comedy actress during the early 1950s in Tamil films. She has acted in around 350 movies in Tamil language. Her debut film was Ponmudi in 1950, directed by Ellis R. Dungan.

Early life
Muthulakshmi was born in 1931 to Ponnaiyapandiyan and Shanmugathammal at Thoothukudi, Madras Presidency (now in Tamil Nadu). She studied up to eighth grade and while studying she desired to learn Carnatic music and Classical dance and enter the film industry. She confirmed that she would be a cinema actress. In Chennai, her uncle M. Perumal worked as a dancer at the director of the film K. Subramaniyam. With his help she decided to enter the film industry. With the help of Perumal, Muthulakshmi got the chance to be in the mural dance of Chandralekha (1948). Muthulakshmi played the dance scene with a large number of women participants and danced with T. R. Rajakumari in some scenes. She worked for a few months at a salary of 65 rupees at Gemini Studio.

Career
After Mahabahli Chakravarthi, she starred in minor roles in films such as Minmini, Deethwa Manohari and Parijatham. In 1950, she appeared in a comedy role in Ponmudi produced by Modern Theatres, which made a big turn in Muthulakshmi's career. In  Or Iravu (1951), with screenplay written by C. N. Annadurai and produced by AVM Productions, she played K. R. Ramasamy's wife Bhavani. In Thirumbi Paar (1953), she played a dumb woman. Muthulakshmi was paired with K. A. Thangavelu, Kaka Radhakrishnan, A. Karunanidhi, J. P. Chandra Babu, T. R. Ramachandran, Major Sundarrajan, S. Rama Rao, and M. R. Radha.

Personal life
Muthulakshmi married P. K. Muthuramalingam in 1958, he was supervisor of the state agency. Chairman of the Tamil Nadu Peninsula Institute. She was Sister in law of famous director T. P. Gajendran. She died on 29 May 2008, having suffered ill health and being hospitalised in Vijaya hospital, then she was shifted to home. She spent one month at home with proper medical care. Her body was cremated in Nungamabakkam, Chennai.

Filmography
She has acted in around 350 movies in Tamil films.

1940s

1950s

1960s

References

External links
 
 T. P. Gajendran

1931 births
2008 deaths
Tamil actresses
Indian film actresses
20th-century Indian actresses
People from Thoothukudi
Actresses from Tamil Nadu